Iyela is an administrative ward in the Mbeya Urban district of the Mbeya Region of Tanzania. In 2016 the Tanzania National Bureau of Statistics report there were 34,864 people in the ward, from 31,634 in 2012.

Neighborhoods 
The ward has 2 neighborhoods.
 Airport
 Block T
 Ilembo
 Iyela Namba 1
 Iyela Namba 2
 Mapambano
 Nyibuko
 Pambogo

References 

Wards of Mbeya Region